Fort Loudoun was a historic fortification of the French and Indian War, located in what is now Winchester, Virginia.  The fort was built between 1756 and 1758 under the supervision of George Washington, then a colonel in the Virginia Regiment.  It was named for John Campbell, 4th Earl of Loudoun, who commanded the British forces in North America for a time during the war.  Washington and his militia regiment were headquartered at the fort for two years.  The fort was a roughly square bastioned earthworks, whose extent spread across where North Loudoun Street runs.

The property at 419 North Loudoun encompasses the historic heart of the fort, including a well dating to the fort's construction, and a portion of its northwest bastion.  This area has been listed on the National Register of Historic Places.  This property is now owned by the non-profit French and Indian War Foundation.

See also
Adam Kurtz House, Washington's headquarters while the fort was under construction, now a museum
National Register of Historic Places listings in Winchester, Virginia

References

External links
 

Loudoun
Loudoun
Loudoun
National Register of Historic Places in Winchester, Virginia
Archaeological sites on the National Register of Historic Places in Virginia
1758 establishments in Virginia
Buildings and structures in Winchester, Virginia
French and Indian War forts